Danial Mousavi is an Iranian football midfielder who plays for Esteghlal Ahvaz in the Iran Pro League.

Club career
Mousavi promoted to Esteghlal Ahvaz first team in summer 2015. He made his professional debut for Esteghlal Ahvaz on December 23, 2015 against Naft Tehran where he used as a substitute for Reza Ayyar.

Club career statistics

References

External links
 Danial Mousavi at IranLeague.ir

1997 births
Living people
Iranian footballers
Esteghlal Ahvaz players
Association football midfielders
People from Ahvaz
Sportspeople from Khuzestan province